Josetxu is a Basque form of given name José (Joseph). A similar form is Josetxo. Notable people with the name include:

 Josetxu Obregón, (born 1979) Spanish cellist

Basque masculine given names